Bankstown Bites Food Festival is a food festival that takes place in the suburb of Bankstown in Sydney, Australia.

Festival 
Started in 2005 by the Bankstown City Council, the event is held annually in July and includes cooking demonstrations, live performances, tours of local food outlets, activities for the kids and food stalls. An estimated 10,000 people attend each year.

Local and celebrity chefs conduct cooking demonstrations. Chefs such as Miguel Maestre, Darren Simpson, Ed Halmagyi and Iain Hewitson have all been a part of the event. Local chefs including Antonios Chayna, from Platform 1, and Robert Green, Bel Cibo, have also been a part of Bites to promote local cuisine. Both local and celebrity chefs contribute to the annual Bankstown Bites Food Festival Recipe Book.

Discovery Food Tours take place during the festival, which are themed tours. Themes include Asian Explorer, European Delights, Aboriginal bush tucker food and Treats from the Middle East. The range of food at the festival includes Lebanese pizza, Indian sweets, African staples, Vietnamese pho, Balkan sausages, Greek cakes, Filipino groceries, Chinese teas and halal butchers.

The festival also has activities like cooking classes, sustainability displays and food craft, rides and puppet shows for kids. The festival also featured art exhibitions, a  poetry slam performance and fruit hat and sculpture making. The Bankstown Talent Advancement Program has local performers at the festival.

There was no festival in 2020 and 2021 due to COVID-19 pandemic in Australia.

Celebrity Chefs 

 2006 – Vince Sorrenti
 2007 – Iain Hewitson
 2008 – Fast Ed (Ed Halmagyi)
 2009 – Fast Ed (Ed Halmagyi)
 2010 – Miguel Maestre
 2011 – Darren Simpson
 2012 – Justine Schofield
 2013 – Marion Grasby
 2014 - Fast Ed (Ed Halmagyi)
 2015 - Adam Liaw
 2016 - Ben O'Donoghue
 2017 - Darren Robertson
 2018 - Colin Fassnidge
 2019 - Matt Sinclair
 2020 – NONE
 2021 – NONE
 2022 – Adrian Richardson and Alvin Quah

References

External links 
 City of Canterbury Bankstown, Bankstown Bites Food Festival page

Festivals in Sydney
Food and drink festivals in Australia
Tourist attractions in Sydney
Events in Sydney
Festivals established in 2005
2005 establishments in Australia
Bankstown, New South Wales